Pamela Oei (born 26 January 1972) is a Singaporean actress. Oei is a theatre actress.

Background
Oei is part of the cabaret trio Dim Sum Dollies. She is also a certified Allen Carr therapist.

Film roles
Oei played the part of Peggy in the 1998 comedy romance Peggy Su! which was about a 19-year-old Chinese woman living in Liverpool, England in the early 1960s.

Personal life
Oei is married to the Singaporean writer-director and filmmaker Ken Kwek, and the couple has one son.

References

External links

 Dim Sum Dollies official website

1972 births
Living people
Singaporean film actresses
Singaporean stage actresses
Singaporean television actresses